Qazanzəmi is a village in the Jabrayil District of Azerbaijan. The Army of Azerbaijan recaptured the village on 28 October 2020.

References 

Populated places in Jabrayil District